Ho Yen Chye (2 December 1966 – 12 April 2021) was a Singaporean judoka. He competed in the men's heavyweight event at the 1992 Summer Olympics.

References

External links
 

1966 births
2021 deaths
Singaporean male judoka
Olympic judoka of Singapore
Judoka at the 1992 Summer Olympics
Singaporean sportspeople of Chinese descent
Place of birth missing